Adhilingesvarar Temple, Pannur is a Siva temple in Mayiladuthurai district in Tamil Nadu (India).

Vaippu Sthalam
It is one of the shrines of the Vaippu Sthalams sung by Tamil Saivite Nayanar Sundarar.

Presiding deity
The presiding deity is  Adhilingesvarar. The Goddess is known as Akilandesvari.

Other Shrines
Very near to the temple, Sangili Veeran shrine is found. At the right side shrine of the Goddess is found.

Location
It is situated near Pavakkudi in Mayiladuthurai-Kollumangudi-Karaikkal road.

References

External links
 மூவர் தேவார வைப்புத்தலங்கள், பன்னூர் - pannUr, Sl.No.208

Shiva temples in Mayiladuthurai district